The following lists events that happened in 2006 in Iceland.

Incumbents
President – Ólafur Ragnar Grímsson
Prime Minister – Halldór Ásgrímsson (until 15 June), Geir Haarde (starting 15 June)

Events

June
 June 6 - Iceland's Prime Minister Halldór Ásgrímsson resigns after poor showings in local elections. Foreign Minister Geir Haarde takes over.

October
 October 17 - Whaling in Iceland is to resume, in contravention of a 20-year moratorium passed by the International Whaling Commission.
 October 22 - Icelandic fisherman kill a fin whale, breaking the International Whaling Commission's ban on commercial whaling.

 
2000s in Iceland
Iceland
Iceland
Years of the 21st century in Iceland